The 2021–22 Legia Warsaw season is the club's 105th season of existence, and their 85rd in the top flight of Polish football. In addition to the domestic league, Legia Warsaw are participating in this season's editions of the Polish Cup, the Polish Super Cup, the UEFA Champions League and the UEFA Europa League.

On 21 November 2021, Legia equaled their record of their Ekstraklasa defeats in a row, following their ninth loss at Górnik Zabrze (the same number of defeats was in their 1936 season). On 13 February 2022, with a 1–0 defeat against Warta Poznań, Legia broke their infamous record of defeats in one Ekstraklasa season by losing their fourteenth game in the season.

Players

First-team squad

 

 

° symbol applies for players who joined the club during the season or in the pre-season term.
° symbol applies for players who left the club during the season or in the summer transfer window term, but had made at least one regular-season appearance.

Out on loan

Transfers

In

Out

Pre-season and friendlies
Legia had a pre-season camp in Austria that ran from June 16 to 24. Azerbaijani champion Neftçi Baku and the Russian FC Krasnodar were scheduled be Legia's rivals during the training camp in Austrian Leogang. Ultimately, instead of Neftçi PFK, Legia played against Ferencvárosi TC on June 20 in Kössen. During the national teams break in October, Legia played against their junior team, winning 4–1. Winter training camp was spent in Dubai, United Arab Emirates, with the last matches played in Książenice, Poland. During the national teams break for the UEFA play-offs, Legia played sparring with Widzew Łódź, which ultimately lost 3–2.

Competitions

Overall record

Ekstraklasa

League table

Results by round

Matches

Polish Cup

Polish SuperCup

UEFA Champions League

First qualifying round

Second qualifying round

Third qualifying round

UEFA Europa League

Play-off round

Group stage

Squad statistics

Goal scorers

Notes

References

External links

Legia Warsaw seasons
Legia Warsaw
Legia Warsaw
Legia Warsaw